Johngarthia weileri is a species of land crab in the genus Johngarthia from the eastern Atlantic Ocean.

Distribution
Johngarthia weileri is found on the coast of Cameroon and on the islands in the Gulf of Guinea.

Taxonomy
Gecarcinus weileri was described by Alexander Sendler in 1912, but was treated for a long time as a synonym of G. lagostoma. The two were separated by Michael Türkay in 1973, and placed in the subgenus Johngarthia, which was raised to the rank of genus in 1987 by the same author.

References

Grapsoidea
Crustaceans of the Atlantic Ocean
Crustaceans described in 1912